Silcox Creek is a river in the Hudson Bay drainage basin in census division 23 in Northern Manitoba, Canada. Its flows from David Wilson Lake to the Owl River as a right tributary. The Owl River flows to Hudson Bay.

The station is served by the Via Rail Winnipeg – Churchill train.

See also
List of rivers of Manitoba

References

Rivers of Northern Manitoba
Tributaries of Hudson Bay